Tabish is a given name. Notable people with the given name include:

Tabish Dehlvi (1913–2004), Urdu poet
Tabish Hussain (born 2001), British footballer who has played for the Pakistan national team
Tabish Khair, Indian author and professor
Tabish Khan (born 1984), Pakistani cricketer
Tabish Oza (born 1989), Pakistani fashion model